H75 may refer to:

Curtiss H-75, a variant of the Curtiss P-36 Hawk fighter aircraft
GE H75, the 750 shp or 550 shp variant in the General Electric H-Series of turboprop aircraft engines
HMS Decoy (H75), D-class destroyer of the Royal Navy

See also
Piapot 75H, a Canadian Indian reserve of the Piapot Cree Nation in Saskatchewan